Julie-Anne Derome is a Canadian violinist who was born in Montreal, Quebec.

Early life and education 
Julie-Anne Derome started playing the violin at the age of three. She has studied with Taras Gabora and Sonia Jelinkova at the Montreal Conservatoire, Christopher Rowland at the Royal Northern College of Music in the UK and Mitchell Stern at the Hartt School in the USA.

Awards and recognition 
 Virginia Parker Prize 2003 
 Loan of a Pressenda violin from the Canada Council for the Arts instrument bank from 2003–2006 
 Loan of a Rocca violin from the Canada Council for the Arts instrument bank from 2000–2003 
 Loan of an Amati violin from the Royal Northern College of Music from 1992–1995 
 Prix opus in 2001 with Trio Fibonacci (shining abroad ) 
 Mendelssohn Trust Award, UK, in 1995
 Special prize for "Anthèmes" by Pierre Boulez at the Yehudi Menuhin competition, Paris, France in 1991

Career 
Julie-Anne Derome prioritizes a scintillating technique, a rigorous bow and original poetic colours.

Julie-Anne Derome gave the world première of the revised version of the Berg Violin Concerto with the symphony orchestra of the RNCM  in 1992, which triggered her passion for 20th-century music. She regularly premieres concertos by Canadian composers and solo works with ensembles.

In 1998 Julie-Anne founded the Trio Fibonacci. The group plays music for piano trio of all eras, being particularly recognised for its brilliant performances of contemporary repertoire. The group has played on all continents with the exception of Oceania and premiered over fifty works by Canadian and International composers such as Mauricio Kagel, Enno Poppe, Michael Finnissy, Pascal Dusapin and Jonathan Harvey.

Partial discography 
 CD of New Canadian piano trios (Centrediscs Label), 2009 
 Trio of composer Benoît Mernier, (Cypres label), 2006 
 British music (NMC label, London, Angleterre), 2005
 Monographic CD dedicated to composer Denis Bosse (Cypres label), 2004 
 CD dedicated to composer Harry Crowl (Rio Arte label, Brazil), 2003
 Jonathan Harvey (Atma label), 2001
 Anthology of Rio de Janeiro composers (Rio Arte label, Brazil), 2000
 Volando by Isabelle Panneton with SMCQ Ensemble (Atma label, 1999)
 Nouvelle musique montréalaise vol. 2 – (SNE label), 1999
 Corale by Luciano Berio with SMCQ Ensemble (Analekta label), 1997
 « Solo » - Contemporary works for solo violin with world premiere recording of Anthèmes de Pierre Boulez (Atma label), 1996

References

External links 
 
 Site of Trio Fibonacci

Living people
Canadian classical violinists
Musicians from Montreal
University of Hartford Hartt School alumni
21st-century classical violinists
Year of birth missing (living people)
Women classical violinists
21st-century Canadian violinists and fiddlers
Canadian women violinists and fiddlers